"Big Cold Wind" is a popular song written by Robert Mosely and Bob Elgin. It was recorded in 1961 by Pat Boone, peaking at number 19 on the Billboard Hot 100 and number 5 on the Easy Listening chart in the US.

Charts

References

1961 singles
1961 songs
Pat Boone songs
Songs written by Robert Mosley
Songs written by Bob Elgin